Halifax bus station serves the town of Halifax, West Yorkshire, England. The bus station is owned and managed by West Yorkshire Metro. The bus station was opened in 1989 and is made of up 4 large islands (A, B, C and D) with 20 stands in total. The bus station is situated in the Halifax Town Centre and could be accessed from Northgate and Wade Street. Several services, such as the majority of services to Illingworth and Mixenden do not serve the bus station and use stops in the town centre.

Services
The main operators that use the station are First West Yorkshire, Arriva Yorkshire and Team Pennine. 

Buses run from the bus station to several destinations in the Calderdale area, such as Barkisland, Bradshaw, Brighouse, Copley, Elland, Greetland, Hebden Bridge, Illingworth, Mixenden, Northowram, Ripponden, Rishworth, Southowram, Sowerby Bridge, Sowerby, Stainland, Todmorden and West Vale. Buses also travel to destinations outside the local area, reaching Bradford, Burnley, Huddersfield, Leeds and Rochdale.

Redevelopment 
In March 2021, preparatory works began for a replacement bus station. Construction had already started by September 2021 with only a few stands left in service which were: A2, A3, A4, B1, B2 and B3. As well as this stands A5 and B4 were used as a layover bay. Phase 2 construction started in October, where the bus station switched to the left side so that the left side can be demolished. The new temporary lay out consisted of six bus stands using some old D and C bus stands as B1, B2 and B3. Stand E3 became A2 and some bus stops were put in for Stands A3 and A4. Phase 3 construction began on Sunday 27 February 2022, where the bus station had been moved towards the south of the site with a six stand reversal bay temporary bus station. This bus station consisted stand A to F. 

The new bus station will consist of 19 stands with stands 1–9 being on the south bays and then Stands 10–19 being on the North Side. The Bus Station will also be fully enclosed with solar power energy on the roof tops. Coaches will depart from Stand 1 and then Stands 2 & 3 will be set down stands so no buses will depart from there.

The bottom stands (1–9) will be designed so that buses with the wheel at the front can use the stands.

The cost of the redevelopment is £15.4 million. It will improve connectivity with important places in Halifax like Halifax Sixth Form and the Piece Hall.

References

External links

 Metro's Halifax Bus Station page
Pictures of Halifax Bus Station – Geograph

Buildings and structures in Halifax, West Yorkshire
Bus stations in West Yorkshire
Transport in Calderdale